Alice Finot (born 9 February 1991) is a French athlete. She competed in the women's 3000 metres event at the 2021 European Athletics Indoor Championships, where she won the silver medal.

References

External links

1991 births
Living people
French female middle-distance runners
Sportspeople from Montbéliard
21st-century French women